Butler City may refer to multiple historic place names:

Tonopah, Nevada (originally named Butler City after founder Jim Butler) 
Blaine, Kansas (originally named Butler City after Thomas A. Butler)

See also
Butler (disambiguation)